Tekla Teresa Łubieńska (born 6 June 1767 in Warsaw, died 15 August 1810 in Kraków) – was a Polish playwright, poet and translator.

Biography 
Łubieńska was the daughter of Polish nobles, Franciszek Bieliński, (nephew and adopted son of Franciszek Bieliński), court writer and senator for Czersk and his wife, Krystyna Justyna Sanguszko. She was taught at home. At age of 11 in 1778 she lost her mother. From then on, she was in the care of the duchess, Barbara Sanguszko, her maternal grandmother who gave her a French education. She later married, as his second wife, Feliks Łubieński, a future Minister of Justice in Congress Poland. They had ten children, among them, Tomasz and Henryk. While Tekla's husband was involved in the turbulent politics of the Targowica Confederation, she left pregnant for Prague with her children. On her return to Poland in 1785, she settled in the family estate in Guzów and devoted herself to family life, child-bearing and her writing. She died suddenly at the early age of just 43, in Kraków in August 1810. She is an ancestor of British actor, Rula Lenska.

Writings 
At the time of the Four-Year Sejm she wrote patriotic verse. Initially, she devoted herself to writing chiefly comedies, including dramatic diversions for children. She later produced historical dramas such as: Wanda, queen of Poland (1806), Charlemagne and Wedekind (1807), a two-act drama in verse. She translated works by Jean Racine and Voltaire.

Notable works 
 Lyrical poetry, as yet unpublished but referenced by H. Skimborowicz, "Zorza" 1843; S. z Ż. P. (Pruszakowa), "Tygodnik Ilustrowany" 1863, nr 191-192, (according to Skimborowicz: Many prayers written by her in verse appear in recently published devotional literature but without her signature.)
 Wanda. A tragedy in 5 Acts, published 2 March 1806, and produced on stage in Warsaw on 17 April 1807,
 Charlemagne and Wedekind, an historical drama set to music by J. Elsner, first produced in the National Theatre on 5 December 1807..., Warsaw 1808 (2 editions)
 A response in verse to Ludwik Osiński, in answer to his poem addressed to Countess Lubienska as a paean on her patron saint's day

 Translations 
 Elfryda. Tragedia na wzór dramatów greckich, z angielskiego – Elfreda. A tragedy in the mode of Greek dramas, from the English, unpublished
 P. A. Metastasio: Siroe, unpublished
 J. Racine: Andromaque, unpublished
 Wzór męża i ojca. Komedia z francuskiego, The example of a husband and father, a farce from the French, unpublished
 Voltaire: Candide, unpublished.

According to Skimborowicz: Polish theatre owes [Tekla] several translations of Voltaire's plays, but he fails to mention which ones. An extract of a translated poem by Frenchman, A. Deshoulières is acknowledged as Tekla's by the Warsaw Illustrated weekly'' in 1863.

Letters 
 To her son, Tomasz, from 14 June 1806.

Bibliography 
 Polski Słownik Biograficzny Vol. XVIII (1973)
 Bibliografia Literatury Polskiej – Nowy Korbut Vol. 5: Oświecenie, published by Państwowy Instytut Wydawniczy, Warsaw, 1967 pages 276–277 – A Bibliography of Polish Literature, vol. 5. The Enlightenment.

See also
Feliks Sobański
Theodore de Korwin Szymanowski
Bernard Łubieński
Witold Dzierżykraj-Morawski
Rula Lenska

References

External links 
 Marek Jerzy Minakowski – Genealogia Potomków Sejmu Wielkiego – Polish genealogy service

1767 births
1810 deaths
19th-century Polish women writers
Polish children's writers
Polish women children's writers
Polish translators
Writers from Warsaw
18th-century Polish–Lithuanian poets
18th-century translators
18th-century Polish–Lithuanian women writers
Tekla Teresa Łubieńska